Irina Khromacheva was the defending champion, but retired in the first round against Yang Zhaoxuan.

Zheng Saisai won the title, defeating Zhang Shuai in the final, 6–4, 6–1.

Seeds

Draw

Finals

Top half

Bottom half

Qualifying

Seeds

Qualifiers

Lucky loser

Qualifying draw

First qualifier

Second qualifier

Third qualifier

Fourth qualifier

References
Main Draw
Qualifying Draw

Kunming Open - Singles